Kingsmill is a surname, and may refer to

15th century
 Sir John Kingsmill (judge) (1465-1509), Justice of the Common Pleas
 Sir John Kingsmill (high sheriff) (died 1556), High Sheriff of Hampshire

16th century
 William Kingsmill (priest) ( ? - 1549), English clergyman, last Prior of Winchester, first Dean of Winchester, 1541–1549

17th century
Anne Finch, Countess of Winchilsea (born Anne Kingsmill) (1661-1720), English poet

18th century
 John Allen Kingsmill (1794 - 1869)
 Sir Robert Kingsmill, 1st Baronet (1730-1805), Royal Navy admiral

19th century
 Thomas Kingsmill Abbott, Rev Dr (1829 - 1913) Irish scholar and educator and chair at Trinity College Dublin.
 Walter Kingsmill, Sir (1864 - 1935) Australian politician
 Hugh Kingsmill  (1889 – 1949) British, a versatile writer and journalist
 Charles Kingsmill (1855 - 1935) Canadian admiral

20th century
 William Kingsmill (MP) (1905 – 1971) British
 John Kingsmill (1920 - ) Australian actor
 Richard Kingsmill (1964 - )  Australian music journalist
 Kingsmill Bates (1916 - 2006) British Sailor
 Mark Kingsmill ( - ) Australian, member of the Hoodoo Gurus band

Surnames